Borba Municipality may refer to:
 Borba Municipality, Portugal
 Borba, Amazonas (municipality)
Municipality name disambiguation pages